The VRT, is the national public-service broadcaster for the Flemish Community of Belgium.

History

VRT is the successor to a succession of organisations. The Belgian National Institute of Radio Broadcasting was known as the Nationaal Instituut voor de Radio-omroep (NIR) in Flemish and the  L'Institut National de Radiodiffusion (INR) in French, was founded in 1930 and existed until 1960. This became the Belgische Radio- en Televisieomroep (BRT) in 1960 and the Belgische Radio- en Televisieomroep Nederlandstalige Uitzendingen (BRTN) from 1991 to 1998.

The NIR/INR and BRT (Radio-Télévision Belge, or RTB, in French) had each been single state-owned entities with separate Dutch- and French-language production departments. They were housed in Le Flagey, formerly known as the Maison de la Radio, from when the new building was completed in 1938 until 1974, when the building became too small. However, in 1977, as part of the ongoing state reform in Belgium broadcasting became reserved to the language communities rather than the national government in 1977. Accordingly, BRT/RTB went their separate ways in 1977. While the former French half changed its name to RTBF in 1977, the Dutch side retained the BRT name until becoming BRTN in 1991. However, the two broadcasters share production facilities on Auguste Reyerslaan (French: Boulevard Auguste Reyers) in Brussels.

The final renaming to VRT, on 1 January 1998, followed a change in the organization's legal status: from being part of a semi-governmental entity (a parastatale in Belgian terminology) it had, on 16 April 1997, became a publicly owned corporation (NV van publiek recht) in its own right.

As successors to the NIR/INR, VRT and its counterpart in the French Community of Belgium, RTBF, share the Belgian membership in the European Broadcasting Union (EBU) – an association of public broadcasters in the countries of Europe and the Mediterranean rim that, amongst other activities, organises the annual Eurovision Song Contest. Much like RTBF, it is also one of the 23 founding members.

With the ending of its television monopoly – marked by the creation of VTM, a commercial television company that initially captured more than half of VRT's audience – the public broadcaster has been compelled to fight back, and part of its successful response has been the use of external production houses such as Woestijnvis, the creator of such formats as The Mole (De mol) and Man Bites Dog (Man bijt hond).

Television channels
Television channels are transmitted on:
 Cable: analog and digital on all Belgian and Dutch cable providers;
 IPTV to all major Belgian DSL providers (Proximus, Orange, Scarlet);
 Satellite with paid TV Vlaanderen subscription (encrypted DVB-S2 using SES Astra network).
 Terrestrial with paid TV Vlaanderen subscription (encrypted DVB-T2 using Norkring network) in Flanders and paid Digitenne subscription (encrypted DVB-T2) in the Netherlands. Free to air DVB-T broadcast by VRT was discontinued on 1 December 2018.

Current channels
 Eén (Dutch for: one), the main channel, formerly known as VRT TV1. Started in 1953 on VHF channel 10. In PAL colour since 1971. In 1977 the transmission standard changed from Belgian 625 to European CCIR) standard.
 Canvas, the quality TV channel. Started in 1997.
 Ketnet, the children's channel. Formerly took up Canvas's channel from 6am to 8pm.
 Sporza, the sports channel. Sport programs (like cycling, football, tennis...) are aired under the Sporza name but on the channels of Eén, Canvas or Ketnet. During big sport events (like the Olympics) it is not uncommon for two or more channels to simultaneously air Sporza.

Former channels
 BRTN TV2 was launched on 26 April 1977 as BRT TV2. BRT(N) TV2 broadcast Terzake and Het Journaal 8 uur until Sunday, 30 November 1997, when TV2 ceased transmission. On Monday 1 December 1997, BRTN TV2 was split into two channels: BRTN Ketnet and BRTN Canvas. The two channels were part of BRTN until 1998 – Canvas and Ketnet are still broadcasting as part of VRT2.
 OP12 (Dutch for: on twelve) was a channel used as backup in the event of primetime shortage. Mostly used for excess sport- and culture programs. It was discontinued in 2014.
BVN was a joint Dutch-Flemish TV station for international audiences; some VRT programmes aired as part of BVN's schedule. VRT left the BVN venture in July 2021; the channel is currently owned exclusively by the Dutch public broadcaster NPO and airs an exclusively Dutch schedule.

Radio channels
The VRT broadcasts radio channels in both analog format (FM) and digital format (using DAB+). All channels are also broadcast live over the Internet at radioplus.be.

International broadcasting was done via VRT's Radio Vlaanderen Internationaal (RVi).

Regular channels
 Radio 1 – info channel
 Radio 2 – Flemish channel
 Klara – classical channel
 StuBru – young and alternative channel
 MNM – hit channel

Digital and streaming-only channels
 Klara continuo – uninterrupted classical music
 MNM Hits – uninterrupted popular music
 Nieuws+ – latest news programme continuously repeated

Streaming-only channels
 Radio 1 Classics – uninterrupted classics songs
 Radio 1 De Lage Landen Lijst
 Radio 2 Bene Bene – uninterrupted music from Flemish artists
 Radio 2 Unwind
 Ketnet Hits – uninterrupted kids music
 MNM Hits – the music you love
 MNM R&Beats – uninterrupted urban music
 MNM 90's & 00's – uninterrupted popular music from the nineties and nillies
 StuBru De Tijdloze – uninterrupted alternative classics
 StuBru Hooray – uninterrupted hiphop music
 StuBru Bruut – uninterrupted heavy music
 StuBru UNTZ
 StuBru #ikluisterbelgisch

TMC
They also have a Traffic message channel (TMC) service transmitted on Radio 2.

Logo history

See also
List of radio stations in Belgium
List of television stations in Belgium
Bert De Graeve, former CEO
Tony Mary, former CEO

References

External links

  
 VRT NWS news site of VRT
 16 April 2008 'Belgian pubcaster to launch HD Channel' via Broadband TV News

Television networks in Belgium
Dutch-language television networks
Publicly funded broadcasters
European Broadcasting Union members
Radio stations established in 1930
Television channels and stations established in 1953
1930 establishments in Belgium
State media
Flemish mass media